"Heterosubtypic immunity (HSI) is defined as cross-protection to infection with an influenza A virus serotype other than the one used for primary infection." In layman's terms: an 'infection with "seasonal" influenza A viruses could induce immunity against unrelated sub-strains.'

References

Immunology
Influenza vaccines
Influenza A virus